Lewis Wood may refer to:

 Lewis N. Wood (1799–1868), member of the Wisconsin State Assembly
 Lewis Pinhorn Wood (1848–1918), British landscapist and watercolourist